Almadenejos is a municipality in the province of Ciudad Real, Castile-La Mancha, Spain. It has a population of 481.

References

Municipalities in the Province of Ciudad Real